The Kiss of Hate is a lost 1916 silent film drama starring Ethel Barrymore and H. Cooper Cliffe.

The film had exclusive engagements, sometimes playing for only a day.

Plot
The story takes place in Czarist Russia and concerns an anti-Semitic police commissioner, or Prefect, Count Orzoff(Cliffe) and a woman Nadia(Barrymore) who has spurned his amorous attentions . The commissioner seeks revenge against Nadia by killing her father (W. L. Abingdon). Orzoff becomes governor and Nadia plots revenge against him and is aided by a group of Jews who are also scheming against Orzoff. In further plot twists Nadia becomes romantic with Orzoff's son Sergius(Robert Elliott) and in a bit of payback stabs Sergius in retribution for her father's murder. Sergius is only wounded and Nadia thinking she has killed him tries to commit suicide but Commissioner Orzof's guards stop her.  For the rescue of his son, Nadia somehow gets Count Orzoff to sign papers admitting to persecuting Russian Jews. Nadia is in Orzoff's mansion completing the deal, when that group of Jews set fire to the house killing Nadia, Orzoff and Sergius.

Cast
Ethel Barrymore - Nadia Turgeneff
H. Cooper Cliffe - Michael Orzoff
Robert Elliott - Sergius Orzoff
Roy Applegate - Goliath
Niles Welch - Paul Turgeneff
William L. Abingdon - Count Peter Turgeneff
Victor De Linsky - Vernik
Martin J. Faust - Nicholas
William "Stage" Boyd - Isaac 
Frank Montgomery - Samuels
Ilean Hume - Leah
Daniel Sullivan - Police Spy

References

External links

1916 films
American silent feature films
Lost American films
Films directed by William Nigh
1916 drama films
Silent American drama films
American black-and-white films
Metro Pictures films
Films set in Russia
1916 lost films
Lost drama films
1910s American films]]